Adam Wyman Smith (December 28, 1903 – April 8, 1985) was an American competition swimmer who represented the United States at the 1924 Summer Olympics in Paris.  Smith competed in the men's 1,500-meter freestyle, advanced to the semifinals, and posted a time of 22:39.8.

References

External links
 

1903 births
1985 deaths
American male freestyle swimmers
Olympic swimmers of the United States
People from Bradford, Pennsylvania
Swimmers from Pennsylvania
Swimmers at the 1924 Summer Olympics
20th-century American people